André Bourguignon (8 August 1920 – 9 April 1996) was a French psychiatrist and psychoanalyst, born in Paris.

A psychiatry professor at the University of Paris XII, he was part of a team in charge of translating Sigmund Freud's work from German into French, together with Jean Laplanche, Pierre Cotet and François Robert.

He was father of actress Anémone.

References

External links
Texts by André Bourguignon
 Introduction à la recherche clinique en psychiatrie, par André Bourguignon (séminaire technique INSERM de mars 1979 et mars 1980)
 Le cerveau humain, par André Bourguignon et al. (publication de l'Encyclopedia Universalis)
 De la pluridisciplinarité à la transdisciplinarité, par André Bourguignon (publication du CIRET)
 De la pluridisciplinarité à la transdisciplinarité, par André Bourguignon (publication du GRIT)
 Introduction à L'Homme inachevé, par André Bourguignon (texte non revu par l'auteur)

About André Bourguignon
 André Bourguignon : hommage à un humaniste, par Jean-Philippe Catonné (publication du GREP)
 André Bourguignon, par François-Marie Michaut
 De qui souffrez-vous ? Chapitre 2 : Le remède médecin, par François-Marie Michaut
 André Bourguignon, psychiatre, par Jacques Chancel, émission Radioscopie du 9 mai 1974 
 Die Ermüdbarkeit myotonischer Muskeln. La fatigabilité des muscles myotoniques. Georges Bourguignon et André Bourguignon, Biomedizinische Technik/Biomedical Engineering, 2(9):258–274, janvier 1957.
 La Mesotherapie, comme et porquoi; Salus Editrice, Janvier 1977

1920 births
1996 deaths
University of Paris alumni
French psychiatrists
20th-century French physicians